This is a list of mountains in the country of Algeria.

See also
 Ahaggar Mountains
 Teffedest Mountains
 Khachna Mountains